The following is a list of keytarists. A keytarist is a musician that plays the keytar, a keyboard or synthesizer worn around the neck and shoulders, similar to a guitar. Only notable musicians who are widely noted for their use of the keytar as reported in reliable sources are included.

Damon Albarn of Blur and Gorillaz
Thomas Anders
Daisuke Asakura Japanese composer and musician.
Victoria Asher (Cobra Starship)
Joe Atlan
Matthew Bellamy of Muse
Christopher Bowes of Alestorm
Bob Casale of DEVO
Régine Chassagne of Arcade Fire
Neil Cicierega
Chick Corea (Chick Corea Elektric Band)
Stephen Devassy Indian Musician and Composer.
Thomas Dolby
Brett Domino
Geoff Downes of Asia and Yes
George Duke
Donald Fagen of Steely Dan
David Garcia
Gregg Giuffria
Magne Furuholmen of A-HA (used it during the 80's)
Jan Hammer
Herbie Hancock 
Paul Hardcastle
Imogen Heap
Tonči Huljić
Randy Jackson
J-Break
Jean Michel Jarre
Howard Jones English pop singer
John Paul Jones of Led Zeppelin
Elisa Jordana (Cobra Starship)
Tyler Joseph of Twenty One Pilots
Keytar Bear
Henrik Klingenberg of Sonata Arctica
Holly Knight
Tetsuya Komuro of TM Network.
Simon Kvamm of the Dan Nephew
Lady Gaga
James Lascelles of Steve Harley and Cockney Rebel (though only on the riff of 'Mr. Raffles (Man, It Was Mean)')
Robert Lamm of Chicago
John Lawry of Petra
Pablo Lescano
Indra Lesmana
Lights
Barış Manço
Manfred Mann of Manfred Mann's Earth Band
Sandy Marton
Page McConnell of Phish
Paul Meany of Mutemath
Bridgit Mendler
Prince
Vadim Pruzhanov of DragonForce
Jordan Rudess of Dream Theater
Tom Schuman of Spyro Gyra
Elisa Schwartz, formerly of Cobra Starship
Dave Stewart
Watch Out For Snakes
will.i.am
"Weird Al" Yankovic
Yenny of Wonder Girls
Edgar Winter

See also

Lists of musicians

References

Keytar